Douglas Trendle (né Woods; born 6 September 1958), better known as Buster Bloodvessel, is an English singer who has been the frontman of the two-tone band Bad Manners since forming the band in 1976. He took his stage name from the bus conductor played by Ivor Cutler in the Beatles' 1967 film Magical Mystery Tour.

Early life
Bloodvessel was born Douglas Woods in the Stoke Newington area of London on 6 September 1958. The son of a single mother, he was adopted by his great-aunt Mary Trendle and her husband Edward, and was legally given their surname. He did not know he was adopted until the age of seven, when he overheard Mary talking to a neighbour and discovered that the woman he knew as "Auntie Lily" was really his mother. He never met his father.

Music career
Bloodvessel founded Bad Manners with friends at Woodberry Down Comprehensive School in north London in 1976. Bad Manners were a popular live attraction in North London, with their brand of humorous ska making them comedians of the ska revival scene, with Bloodvessel often wagging his large tongue at his audiences. Bad Manners earned nine Top 40 singles between 1980 and 1983. However, the group originally broke up in 1987 after their recording contract with Portrait Records ended, and Bloodvessel formed a new outfit called Buster's Allstars, performing at clubs and pubs in London. He still played some concerts with Bad Manners at larger venues, along with some new musicians and a few other original band members.

In 1988, Bloodvessel licensed the Blue Beat Records name and logo, and ran the record label from an old houseboat in Hackney. Blue Beat issued a number of releases, notably by Bad Manners, Napoleon Solo, Buster's Allstars, and the Billies, but the label folded in 1990.

Bloodvessel has appeared in the 1987 films Out of Order and Sammy and Rosie Get Laid before landing a part in an episode of Boon in 1990. In 1998, he signed a solo deal with the Virgin Records offshoot label Innocent Records and recorded a studio album, but the label decided to axe the project just before his debut solo single was to be released.

Personal life
Bloodvessel has struggled with morbid obesity and underwent laparoscopic gastric bypass surgery in 2004, with his weight dropping from 31 stone (196.86 kg; 434 lbs) to 13 stone (82.6 kg; 182 lbs). 

Bloodvessel once owned a hotel in Margate called Fatty Towers, which specifically catered for larger customers with features such as extra large beds and baths as well as fatty meals. The hotel closed in 1998 and Bloodvessel moved back to London. He often appears as a guest on various television shows, as well as in the tabloid newspapers. He was the main sponsor of football team Margate F.C. in the 1990s.

In early 2001, Bloodvessel fell seriously ill during a concert in Perugia, Italy, but recovered.

References

External links
 
 
 

1958 births
Living people
British ska musicians
English male singers
English male actors
People from Hackney Central
People from Stoke Newington